Condé-sur-Huisne (literally Condé on Huisne) is a former commune in the Orne department in north-western France. On 1 January 2016, it was merged into the new commune of Sablons-sur-Huisne.

Description

Condé-sur-Huisne lies between the towns of Condeau to its east and Verrières to its west and Saint-Germain-des-Grois to its north and Nogent-le-Rotrou to its south.

Condé-sur-Huisne has a large, high feudal mound where a square keep castle was built but destroyed in 1428 by the English during the Hundred Years' War. Only a half-buried, lower chapel dedicated to Saint John the Baptist (12th century) remains.

See also
Communes of the Orne department
 Perche

References

Condesurhuisne
Articles containing video clips
Perche